Pterostylis calceolus, commonly known as the Bungonia rustyhood, is a plant in the orchid family Orchidaceae and is endemic to New South Wales. It has a rosette of overlapping leaves and between two and seven reddish-brown flowers with transparent "windows" and a fleshy brown, insect-like labellum. It is only known from near Bungonia.

Description
Flowering occurs from October to November.

Taxonomy and naming
Pterostylis calceolus was first formally described in 1989 by Mark Clements from a specimen collected in Bungonia Gorge and the description was published in Australian Orchid Research. The specific epithet (calceolus) refers to the outline of the labellum which resembles a slipper or shoe of the type worn in the middle-ages.

Distribution and habitat
The Bungonia rustyhood is only known from the Bungonia district where it grows in forest and woodland.

References

calceolus
Endemic orchids of Australia
Orchids of New South Wales
Plants described in 1989